Nyearctia is a monotypic moth genus in the family Erebidae described by Watson in 1975. Its only species, Nyearctia leucoptera, was first described by George Hampson in 1920. It is found in French Guiana, Suriname, Guyana and Venezuela.

References

Phaegopterina
Moths of South America
Fauna of Suriname
Moths described in 1920
Monotypic moth genera